Lomovatka is a rural locality (a settlement) in and the administrative center of Lomatovskoye Rural Settlement, Velikoustyugsky District, Vologda Oblast, Russia. The population was 1,513 as of 2002. There are 18 streets.

Geography 
Lomovatka is located 107 km northwest of Veliky Ustyug (the district's administrative centre) by road. Pikhtovo is the nearest rural locality.

References 

Rural localities in Velikoustyugsky District